Denis Periša (born July 23, 1983) is a political activist, whistle blower and computer hacker from Šibenik, Croatia. He was convicted and criminally charged in September 1999. He was forbidden to use any form of computer systems or the internet for hacking the e-mail of politician Veselin Pejnović while planting a backdoor to his network. He founded the computer security website Jezgra.org in 1997. He founded ŠI-WIFI wireless, an organization that was formed for his town in 2005.

Activism

During the COVID-19 pandemic, as part of a group, Periša made 3D-printed face shields for the local hospitals in Drniš and Knin.

Law and order 
Beginning in 2017, Periša worked on cases for local police and DORH (State Attorney) by coming across and prosecuting online bullies and people spreading hate with possible use of physical violence towards others. He spoke about how to report such crimes on National Television. Shortly after he was threatened and was put under police protection. Later on, he was searching for fugitive Ivica Todorić and his online servers.

Political standoff
In August 2010, Periša claimed that he blew the whistle on Social Democratic Party (SDP) for overspending the local municipal budget on a wireless network. He privately mailed the city mayor, to which the mayor replied roughly with no interest. Periša then publicly confronted city Mayor Ante Županović to accuse him of stealing public money.

He turned out to be right in 2013 after a local news paper tested out the existing wireless network and concluded it was not working. After the Croatian Democratic Union (HDZ) took power, Periša was appointed to rebuild and maintain the local city wireless, which he did in late 2014. More info is below.

Anonymous group
After a decade of claiming to lead hacking groups, Periša claims he finally joined the Anonymous group firstly fighting against ACTA and similar acts. He endorses and motivates people to start using Linux OS if nothing then for lower power consumption and better power saving. On June 4, 2015, Periša appeared on a skype interview for "Alter EGO" show talking about the internet and anonymously representing himself as one of the internet freedom fighters.

Innovations and Technology

LoRaWAN
In January 2019, Periša built and installed a new type of sensor network for the town of Šibenik. The technology is LoRaWAN and it's based on an 868Mhz version for this part of the world. Grad Šibenik was the first town to do such a thing in this part of the world.

Biohacking
On 7 October Periša implanted an xNT NFC chip inside his hand and was the first to speak about it on national television and other media.

Wireless
Periša was the founder and President of the ŠI-WIFI organization from 21 July 2005 until 20 November 2017, when it was closed and a new city network was established.

Periša built a free town wireless network with city funds in April 2014. The network was placed on 10 public nodes with 30 public antennas and access points.

Public appearances
In 2014 Periša began appearing at conferences, giving a guest lecture at the Split Film Festival (STFF) on the subject of "Hacking and (Privacy) Protection". He was interviewed about the same subject by H-Alter magazine with the subject "Table to table via smartphones", commenting on his previous work and the WikiLeaks arrests which had taken place shortly before that.

In the summer of 2014, Periša was invited to do a video presentation on the island of Prvić with the subject of hacking and creative thinking.

Periša conducted a live hack on the RTL television channel and did a demonstration of an MITM attack on 14 May 2019.

In November 2019 Periša gave a live presentation and lecture on "Potrošači Digitalnog Doba" in Split, Croatia, on the subject of personal protection and Internet news, hacks and biohacking.

References

Hackers
Living people
1983 births